Oliden is a localidad and a small rural community in Brandsen Partido in Buenos Aires Province, Argentina.

Population 
According to the 2001 census, the population count was 198.

Notes and references

External links 
 
 Coord and NASA, Google images
 Oliden images

Populated places in Buenos Aires Province